The Order of Preachers, or the Dominican Order, are a Catholic mendicant order founded by St Dominic de Guzman and approved by Pope Innocent III in 1216.

Saints 
The following people belonging to the order have been proclaimed saints throughout history:

Numerous Dominicans were included in the canonization of the 117 martyrs of Vietnam and a group of martyrs in Nagasaki, including Saint Lorenzo Ruiz.

Beatified 
Numerous Dominicans have been beatified, including:

Bishops and Cardinals 
Four Dominican friars have served as Bishop of Rome:
 Pope Innocent V (r. 1276)
 Pope Benedict XI (r. 1303-04)
 Pope Pius V (r. 1566-72)
 Pope Benedict XIII (r. 1724-30)

There are three Dominicans in the College of Cardinals:
 Dominik Duka (b. 1943), Czech, Archbishop of Prague
 Christoph Schönborn (b. 1945), Austrian, Archbishop of Vienna
Jose Advincula (b. 1952), Filipino, Archbishop of Manila

Others 
Other notable Dominicans include:
Matteo Bandello (c. 1480-1562), author of novellas and soldier
Gabriel Barletta (fl. 15th century), renowned preacher
Fra Bartolomeo (1472-1517), Italian Renaissance painter
Conradin of Bornada (d. 1429), renowned preacher
Vincent of Beauvais (c. 1184–c. 1264), author/compiler of the encyclopedic text The Great Mirror (Speculum Maius)
Frei Betto (b. 1945), Brazilian friar, theologian, political activist and former government adviser
Martin Bucer (1491-1551), apostate who left the Order to join the Protestant Reformation
Meister Eckhart (c. 1260–c. 1328) German mystic and preacher
Giordano Bruno (1548–1600), philosopher and astronomer condemned as a heretic condemned and burned in Rome
Edward Ambrose Burgis (c. 1673–1747), historian and theologian
Elias Burneti of Bergerac (fl. 13th century), theologian
Anne Buttimer (1938–2017), University College Dublin
Thomas Cajetan (1469-1534), theologian, philosopher, and cardinal, who famously debated Martin Luther
Tommaso Campanella (1568-1639), philosopher, theologian, astrologer, and poet, who was denounced by the Inquisition
Melchor Cano (1509-1560), Spanish theologian of the School of Salamanca
Oliviero Carafa (1430-1511), Italian cardinal and diplomat
Diego Carranza (b. 1559), Mexican missionary
Bartolomé de las Casas (1484–1566), Spanish bishop in the West, known as the Protector of the Indians
Marie-Dominique Chenu (1895–1990), French theologian of the Nouvelle Théologie
Richard Luke Concanen (1747–1810), first Bishop of New York
Yves Congar (1904–1995), French theologian of the Nouvelle Théologie, later cardinal
Brian Davies (b. 1951), distinguished Professor of Philosophy, Fordham University; former Regent of Blackfriars, Oxford
Jeanine Deckers (1933–1985), briefly famous Belgian singer-songwriter
Nicholas Eymerich (c. 1316-1399), Inquisitor General of the Kingdom of Aragon and theologian
Anthony Fisher (b. 1960), Archbishop of Sydney
Réginald Marie Garrigou-Lagrange (1877–1964), leading 20th-century Thomist
Bernard Gui (1261–1331), French bishop and inquisitor of the Cathars
Gustavo Gutierrez (b. 1928), Peruvian liberation theologian
Jean Jérôme Hamer (1916–1996), Belgian theologian and Curia official, cardinal
 Hermann of Minden, 13th century provincial superior of the German province of Dominicans
Henrik Kalteisen (c. 1390-1464), 24th Archbishop of Nidaros
Robert Kilwardby (c. 1215-1279), Archbishop of Canterbury and cardinal
Heinrich Kramer (1430–1505), German author of the Malleus Maleficarum, a handbook for witch hunting
Jean-Baptiste Henri Lacordaire (1802-1861), French theologian, journalist, and political activist
James of Lausanne (d. 1321), superior of the Order in France
Osmund Lewry (1929-1987), English theologian
Domingo de Soto (1494-1546), Spanish theologian and philosopher of the School of Salamanca
John Tauler (c. 1300-1361), one of the Rhineland Mystics
Johann Tetzel (c. 1465-1519), Inquisitor for Poland and Saxony, renowned preacher and indulgence seller
Herbert McCabe (1926–2001), English theologian and scholar
José S. Palma (b. 1950), Archbishop of Cebu
 Teodoro Bacani Jr. (b. 1947), Bishop of Novaliches 
 Rodolfo Fontiveros Beltran (1948–2017), Bishop of San Fernando de La Union 
Socrates Villegas (b. 1960), Archbishop of Lingayen-Dagupan
Malcolm McMahon (b. 1949), Archbishop of Liverpool
Vincent McNabb (1868–1943), Irish scholar, apologist and ecumenist
Aidan Nichols (b. 1948), English theologian
Marco Pellegrini (fl.1500), Vicar-General of the Dominicans in Lombardy 
Dominique Pire (George) (1910–1969), recipient of the Nobel Peace Prize
Timothy Radcliffe (b. 1945), 85th Master of the Order of Preachers
Girolamo Savonarola (1452–1498), Italian orator, de facto ruler of Florentine Republic after the overthrow of the Medici family, burned by the Inquisition
Edward Schillebeeckx (1914–1998), Belgian theologian
Francisco de Vitoria (c. 1483-1546), Spanish philosopher and theologian of the School of Salamanca, renowned for his work in international law
Michel-Louis Guérard des Lauriers (1898-1988), French theologian, professor at the Pontifical Lateran University in Rome, advisor of Pope Pius XII on the dogma of the Assumption of Mary, author of the Thesis of Cassiciacum, Sedevacantist bishop

References
Members of the Dominican Order